4 KLM is a small village in Rawla Mandi tehsil of Sri Ganganagar district, Rajasthan, India. It is 186 km from district headquarters. It borders on the Bikaner district to the south. Kumhars of Hathusar village are original residents of this village. The major occupations include farming, labour and mining.

References 

Villages in Sri Ganganagar district